The 1997 Giro d'Italia was the 80th edition of the Giro d'Italia, one of cycling's Grand Tours. The Giro began in Venice, with a flat stage on 17 May, and Stage 11 occurred on 28 May with a stage to Lido di Camaiore. The race finished in Milan on 8 June.

Stage 1
17 May 1997 — Venice to Venice,

Stage 2
18 May 1997 — Mestre to Cervia,

Stage 3
19 May 1997 — Santarcangelo di Romagna to San Marino,  (ITT)

Stage 4
20 May 1997 — San Marino to Arezzo,

Stage 5
21 May 1997 — Arezzo to Monte Terminillo,

Stage 6
22 May 1997 — Rieti to Lanciano,

Stage 7
23 May 1997 — Lanciano to Mondragone,

Stage 8
24 May 1997 — Mondragone to Cava de' Tirreni,

Stage 9
25 May 1997 — Cava de' Tirreni to Castrovillari,

Stage 10
26 May 1997 — Castrovillari to Taranto,

Rest day
28 May 1997

Stage 11
28 May 1997 — Lido di Camaiore to Lido di Camaiore,

References

1997 Giro d'Italia
Giro d'Italia stages